The Beaumont was a French ship built in 1762 for the French East India Company (FEIC).  Intended for carrying trade from the Indian and Pacific Oceans, she was heavily armed.  When the FEIC was dissolved in 1769 the Beaumont was taken into service with the French Navy, as a fourth-rate ship-of-the-line.  She was sold out of service in 1772 and renamed the Lyon.  Owned by a private citizen the Lyon provided support to the rebels during the American War of Independence and was captured by the British frigate Maidstone in 1778.  Heavily damaged, she was taken to the Royal Navy dockyard in Antigua where she is believed to have sunk.  A wreck was discovered in the dock in 2013 and a 2021 survey found it matched the dimensions of the Beaumont.

Service history 
The Beaumont was built by Caro at Lorient, Brittany, for the French East India Company (FEIC).  She was similar in design to the East Indiamen Villevault and Pondichéry.  Beaumont keel was laid down in March 1762 and she was acquired by the FEIC on 19 August and commissioned into their service in December.  She measured 126' 4" in length at the gundeck (in French feet, equivalent to  imperial), 126' 4" length at the keel ( imperial), 37' in breadth ( imperial) and 14' 6" in depth ( imperial).  Beaumont displacement was 900 tons burthen.  Intended for use as a merchantman she was nevertheless heavily armed for the France to Indian Ocean and Pacific Ocean trades.

The FEIC was dissolved in 1769 and in July of the following year Beaumont became a vessel of the French Navy.  In naval service she was ship-rigged and, mounting 56 guns, was classified as a fourth-rate (a second rang in the French classification system). 

Beaumont left naval service in 1772, being sold to a private citizen and renamed Lyon.  Lyon saw service in the American War of Independence and was captured, while acting in support of the rebels, by the British frigate Maidstone in 1778.  The badly damaged Lyon was taken to the Royal Navy dockyard in Antigua.  Her later fate is not known but she is unlikely to have ever left the dock and is likely to have been stripped down before she was wrecked.  This theory is supported by a 1780 map of Antigua which implied the presence of a French Navy vessel, shipwrecked in the harbour.

Supposed wreck 

The wreck of the Beaumont/Lyon was long suspected to lie within the mud on the bed of Antigua dockyard. A hydrographic survey carried out in 2013 supported this hypothesis. Later that year local diver Maurice Belgrave found the timbers of a ship in the mud while carrying out the routine cleaning of an anchor chain.

The wreck remained uninvestigated until 2021 when an archaeological expedition was funded by the governments of France and Martinique and by the American Richard Lounsbery Foundation. The identification of the vessel was not confirmed but its dimensions are consistent with those of the Beaumont. If confirmed the wreck would be the only one known of an FEIC vessel with an intact hull. The wreck has been deemed too costly and difficult to raise but some artefacts of its timbers and ballast have been recovered.

References 

1762 ships
French East India Company
Ships of the line of the French Navy
Ships built in Lorient